Szombathely (see also other alternative names) is the 10th largest city in Hungary. It is the administrative centre of Vas county in the west of the country, located near the border with Austria. Szombathely lies by the streams Perint and Gyöngyös (literally "pearly"), where the Alpokalja (Lower Alps) mountains meet the Little Hungarian Plain. The oldest city in Hungary, it is known as the birthplace of Saint Martin of Tours.

Etymology
The name Szombathely is from the Hungarian szombat, "Saturday" and hely, "place", referring to its status as a market town, and the medieval markets held on Saturday every week. Once a year during August they hold a carnival to remember the history of "Savaria".

The Latin name Savaria or Sabaria comes from Sibaris, the Latin name of the river Gyöngyös (German Güns). The root of the word is the Proto-Indo-European word *seu, meaning "wet". The Austrian overflowing of the Gyöngyös/Güns is called Zöbern, most probably a derivation of its Latin name. The city is known in Croatian as Sambotel, in Slovene as Sombotel and in Yiddish as סאמבאטהעלי (Sombathely).

The German name, Steinamanger, means "stone on the green" (Stein am Anger). The name was coined by German settlers who encountered the ruins of the Roman city of Savaria.

The Slovak name, Kamenec, also stems from the root 'stone' (kameň = stone), similar to the German variant.

History

Savaria, the Roman city

 
Szombathely is the oldest recorded city in Hungary. It was founded by the Romans in 45 AD under the name of Colonia Claudia Savariensum (Claudius' Colony of Savarians), and it was the capital of the Pannonia Superior province of the Roman Empire. It lay close to the important "Amber Road" trade route. The city had an imperial residence, a public bath and an amphitheatre. In 2008, remains of a mithraeum were discovered.

Emperor Constantine the Great visited Savaria several times. He ended the persecution of Christians, which previously claimed the lives of many people in the area, including Bishop St. Quirinus and St. Rutilus. The emperor reorganised the colonies and made Savaria the capital of the province Pannonia Prima. This era was the height of prosperity for Savaria: its population grew, and new buildings were erected, among them theatres and churches. St. Martin of Tours was born here. After the death of Emperor Valentinian III, the Huns invaded Pannonia. Attila's armies occupied Savaria between 441 and 445. The city was destroyed by an earthquake in 456.

Savaria/Szombathely in the Middle Ages

The city remained inhabited throughout the Middle Ages. Its city walls were restored, and new buildings were constructed using the stones from the remains of Roman buildings. Much of the Latin population moved away, mostly to Italy, while new settlers, mostly Goths and Longobards, arrived.

In the 6th–8th centuries, the city was inhabited by Pannonian Avars and Slavic tribes. In 795, the Franks defeated these peoples and occupied the city. Charlemagne visited the city where St. Martin was born.

King Arnulf of the Franks gave the city to the archbishop of Salzburg in 875. It is likely that the castle was built around this time, using the stones from the Roman baths. Around 900, they were succeeded by Hungarians, who became the dominant population.

In 1009, Stephen I gave the city to the newly founded Diocese of Győr. The city suffered during the war between King Sámuel Aba and Holy Roman Emperor Henry III, between 1042 and 1044.

Szombathely was destroyed during the Mongol invasion of Hungary in 1241–1242 but was rebuilt shortly after. It was granted Free royal town status in 1407. In 1578, it became the capital of Vas comitatus. The city prospered. In 1605 it was occupied by the armies of István Bocskai.

Szombathely in the 16th to 19th centuries

During the Ottoman occupation of Hungary, the Ottomans invaded the area twice, first in 1664, when they were defeated at the nearby town of Szentgotthárd. Nearly twenty years later, they invaded again in 1683, during the Battle of Vienna. The city walls protected Szombathely both times.

A peaceful period followed the retreat of the Turks until Prince Rákóczi's rebellion against the Habsburgs in the early 18th century. During the rebellion, the city residents supported the prince. The city was occupied by Habsburg armies in 1704, freed in November 1705, then occupied alternately by the two armies over the next years. In June 1710, more than 2,000 people died in a plague, and on May 3, 1716, the city was destroyed by a fire.

After such losses throughout the region, the Habsburg Crown recruited Germans to resettle the depopulated areas, particularly along the Danube River. They were valued for their farming abilities. The Crown allowed them to keep their language and religion. As a result, the city had a German majority for a long time. With increased population, the city began to prosper again. With the support of Ferenc Zichy, Bishop of Győr, a high school was built in 1772. The Diocese of Szombathely was founded in 1777 by Maria Theresa. The new bishop of Szombathely, János Szily, did much for the city: he had the ruins of the castle demolished and had new buildings constructed, including a cathedral, the episcopal palace complex, and a school (opened in 1793).

In 1809, Napoleon's armies occupied the city and held it for 110 days, following a short battle on the main square. In 1813, a cholera epidemic claimed many lives. In 1817, two-thirds of the city was destroyed by fire.

During the revolution in 1848–49, Szombathely supported the revolution. There were no battles in the immediate area because the city remained under Habsburg rule. The years after the Austro-Hungarian Compromise of 1867 brought prosperity. A railway line reached the city in 1865, and in the 1870s Szombathely became a major railway junction. In 1885 the city annexed the nearby villages Ó-Perint and Szentmárton and increased its area.

In the 1890s, when Gyula Éhen was the mayor, the city underwent significant infrastructure development: roads were paved, a sewage system built, and the tram line was built to connect the rail station, the downtown, and the Calvary Church. Private and public interests built the City Casino, the Grand Hotel (Kovács Szálló, later Hotel Savaria), and the area's first orphanage. In forty years, the population quadrupled.

During the mayoralty of Tóbiás Brenner, this prosperity continued. A museum, public bath, monasteries, and several new downtown mansions were built. A school of music and an orchestra were founded.

Szombathely in the 20th and 21st centuries

After the Treaty of Trianon, Hungary lost many of its western territories to Austria.  Only  from the new state border, Szombathely ceased to be the centre of Western Hungary. Trying to regain the throne of Hungary, Charles IV visited the city, where he was greeted with enthusiasm, but he failed to regain power.

Between the world wars, Szombathely prospered. Many schools were founded, and between 1926 and 1929, the most modern hospital of the Transdanubian region was built.

During World War II, as with many other towns in the region, Szombathely was strategic due to the railway, junction, marshalling yards, local aerodrome, and barracks. The town formed part of the logistical military infrastructure supporting Axis forces. In 1944 and 1945, the town and locality were bombed by day on several occasions by aircraft of the US 15th Air Force; at night, bombing runs were made by aircraft from the Royal Air Force 205 Group. These aircraft operated from bases in Italy.

On 28 March 1945, the 6th SS Panzer and 6th Armies were pushed back by an assault from the east across the Raba River by the 46th and 26th Armies of the USSR and the 3rd Ukrainian Front. Soviet forces took control of Szombathely on 29 March 1945.

After the war the city grew, absorbing many nearby villages (Gyöngyöshermán, Gyöngyösszőlős, Herény, Kámon, Olad, Szentkirály, Zanat and Zarkaháza). The government of Hungary was dominated by the Soviet Union. During the revolution in 1956, the city was occupied by the Soviet army.

In the 1970s, the city was industrialized, and many factories were built. In the 1980s, the city prospered, and several new public buildings were built. These included the County Library, public indoor swimming pools, and a gallery.

In 2006, the refurbishing of the city centre's main square was completed, with financial assistance from European Union funds.

28 June 2014 from the highway is also available in the city, having opened the M86 motorway.

History of Szombathely's Jewish communities 
In 1567, Emperor Maximilian II granted the town the privilege of allowing none but Catholics to dwell within its walls. By the 17th and 18th centuries, although the municipal authorities rented shops to Jews, the latter were permitted to remain in the town only during the day, and then only without their families. They lived outside in their own community, known as a shtetl. By the beginning of the nineteenth century, only three or four Jewish families lived in the city. 

The residents of the shtetl Stein-am-Anger dwelt in the outlying districts (now united into one municipality). They separated in 1830 from the community of Rechnitz (Rohonc), of which they had previously formed a part, and were henceforth known as the community of Szombathely. When the Jews of Hungary were emancipated by the law of 1840, the city allowed them to live there. In the unrest of the revolution of 1848, many Jews were attacked and their places looted; they were threatened with expulsion. The authorities intervened and restored peace. The community quickly developed in the city.

The first Jewish elementary school was founded in 1846, and was organized as a normal school in 1905, with four grades and about 230 pupils. The first synagogue was built by the former lord of the town, Duke Batthyányi, who sold it to the Jews. In 1880 the community supported building a large temple, one of the most beautiful in Hungary. Designed by Ludwig Schöne, it combined Oriental and Romantic elements. 

The founder of the community and its first rabbi was Ludwig Königsberger (d. 1861); he was succeeded in turn by Leopold Rockenstein, Joseph Stier(), and Béla Bernstein (called in 1892). A small Orthodox congregation, numbering about 60 or 70 members, separated from the main body in 1870. From 1896 to 1898 Pál Jungreis was rabbi of the Orthodox community but his convictions were not tolerated so Márk Benedikt was appointed rabbi. 
According to the 1910 census, 10.1% of the city's population, or 3125 people, were Jewish by religion. By then they were merchants and professionals, an integral part of the city's culture.

In World War II, during the occupation of Hungary by Nazi Germany, 4228 Jews were deported (July 4–6, 1944) from Szombathely to Auschwitz. The community was essentially destroyed. Since 1975, the former Jewish temple has been adapted for use as a concert hall. A memorial outside commemorates the Jews deported in World War II.

Population

Representation in other media
James Joyce wrote that the character Virág Rudolf, the father of Leopold Bloom, his Jewish Irish protagonist in Ulysses, was from Szombathely.
Savaria appears in Total War: Attila as a Roman settlement in Pannonia

Climate

Politics 
The current mayor of Szombathely is András Nemény (MSZP).

The local Municipal Assembly, elected at the 2019 local government elections, is made up of 21 members (1 Mayor, 14 Individual constituencies MEPs and 6 Compensation List MEPs) divided into this political parties and alliances:

List of mayors
List of City Mayors from 1990:

Media

Mediumwave broadcasting station
Near Szombathely, there is since 1955 at  a mediumwave broadcasting station operated on 1251 kHz with 25 kW, which uses as antenna two 60 metres tall free-standing radio towers insulated against ground. It is the only mediumwave broadcasting station in Hungary using free-standing self radiating towers.

Sport
Szombathely is home to the basketball team Falco KC, 2019 champion of the Nemzeti Bajnokság I/A, the country's top basketball league. Falco plays its home games at the Arena Savaria.

Notable people

László Almásy, born in Burgenland
Adrián Annus
József Asbóth, winner of the 1947 French Open
László Bárdossy
Béla Bartók, composer
Edmund Blum, writer
János Brenner, Roman Catholic priest and martyr 
Zoltan David, jewelry designer
Árpád Fazekas, footballer
Róbert Fazekas
György Garics
Péter Halmosi
Gábor Király
Janos Kajdi, Olympic Boxer Silver Medal Munich 1972
Richárd Rapport, chess grandmaster
Johannes Kretz
Paul László
Eugene Lukacs, composer
László Magyar, explorer of Africa
Dusán Mukics
Krisztián Pars
Miklós Takács de Saár, silviculturist, politician
Martin of Tours
András Schäfer, footballer
Nikolett Szabó
Virág Vörös, ski jumper
Sándor Weöres

Twin towns – sister cities

Szombathely is twinned with:

 Ferrara, Italy
 Hunedoara, Romania
 Kaufbeuren, Germany
 Kolding, Denmark
 Kutaisi, Georgia
 Lappeenranta, Finland
 Lecco, Italy
 Maribor, Slovenia
 Nõmme (Tallinn), Estonia
 Oberwart, Austria
 Ramat Gan, Israel
 Santiago do Cacém, Portugal
 Trnava, Slovakia
 Uzhorod, Ukraine
 Yantai, China
 Yoshkar-Ola, Russia

Gallery

References and notes
References

 by Isidore Singer & Bela Bernstein

Notes

External links

 Official site of Szombathely - More historical and touristic information 
 Official site of the Savaria Historical Festival 
 Szombathely at funiq.hu 

 
County seats in Hungary
Cities with county rights of Hungary
Populated places in Vas County
40s establishments in the Roman Empire
Shtetls
Roman settlements in Hungary
Cities in Hungary
Pannonia Superior
1st-century establishments in Hungary
Populated places established in the 1st century
Holocaust locations in Hungary
45 establishments